Jamie Iredell (born 1976) is an American writer.

Early life 
Iredell grew up in Castroville, California, and attended North Monterey County High School.

Career 
Iredell’s writing has been positively reviewed by the Atlanta Journal-Constitution and The Brooklyn Rail.

Writing in 2010, the Quarterly Conversation said of Prose, Poems, a Novel that "The title of the collection serves as a bold declaration of war on the boundaries of genre. Iredell is not flouting the rules of genre, though. Instead, Iredell weaves his three titular genres together into a form that is all its own, containing elements of each."

Nailed Magazine wrote of The Book of Freaks in 2011, that “Iredell has produced an absolute masterpiece of the absurd and surreal – a faux-encyclopedia that contains pieces of everything and everyone you have ever encountered in your life.”

In 2014, Publishers Weekly noted of I Was a Fat Drunk Catholic School Insomniac, that it is “An entertaining and insightful collection often interested in the messy and difficult aspects of life.”

Los Angeles Magazine listed Last Mass among "6 Books You Need to Read this August" in 2015. Also, in 2015, Slate wrote about Last Mass as “An exemplary work of creative nonfiction in the vein of Maggie Nelson’s Argonauts."

The Atlanta Journal-Constitution has called his writing "wildly imaginative". His 2018 novel The Fat Kid drew comparison to Cormac McCarthy.

In addition to writing, he teaches college literature and creative writing.

Bibliography 
Prose, Poems, a Novel (Orange Alert Press, 2009) .
The Book of Freaks (Future Tense Books, 2010) .
I Was a Fat Drunk Catholic School Insomniac (Future Tense Books, 2011) .
Last Mass (Civil Coping Mechanisms, 2015) .
The Fat Kid (Civil Coping Mechanisms, 2018) .

References 

1976 births
Living people
American male novelists
21st-century American novelists
21st-century American male writers
People from Carmel-by-the-Sea, California